Mood Indigo is an album by saxophonist Frank Morgan which was recorded in 1989 and released on the Antilles label.

Reception

The review by AllMusic's  Scott Yanow said: "Every Morgan recording is well worth picking up (the altoist has been very consistent in the studio), but this one purposely has less mood variation than most and is often a bit melancholy."

Track listing 
 "Lullaby" (George Cables) – 1:29
 "This Love of Mine" (Hank Sanicola, Sol Parker, Frank Sinatra) – 6:36
 "In a Sentimental Mood" (Duke Ellington) – 4:18
 "Bessie's Blues" (John Coltrane) – 8:59
 "A Moment Alone" (Buster Williams) – 1:46
 "Mood Indigo" (Ellington) – 5:59
 "Up Jumped Spring" (Freddie Hubbard) – 4:58
 "Polka Dots and Moonbeams" (Jimmy Van Heusen, Johnny Burke) – 4:29
 "We Three Blues" (Frank Morgan) – 6:55
 "'Round Midnight" (Thelonious Monk) – 6:55
 "Lullaby" (Cables) – 1:36
 "Gratitude" (Morgan) – 0:35

Personnel

Performance
Frank Morgan – alto saxophone, voice (tracks 1–4 & 6–12)
Wynton Marsalis – trumpet (tracks 4 & 6)
George Cables (tracks 1, 3, 8, 10 & 11), Ronnie Mathews (tracks 2, 4, 6 & 7) – piano 
Buster Williams (tracks 2, 4–7, 9 & 10) – bass
Al Foster (tracks 2, 4, 6, 7, 9 & 10) – drums

Production
John Snyder – producer
Joe Lopes – engineer

References 

Frank Morgan (musician) albums
1989 albums
Antilles Records albums